Eremosyne pectinata, the sole species in the genus Eremosyne, is an annual herb endemic to the south coast of Western Australia.

Taxonomy
Historically it was placed in the Saxifragaceae family. It was placed in its own family, Eremosynaceae, under the Cronquist system; later merged into Escalloniaceae; before being restored to Eremosynaceae in the APG II system. Recent studies have confirmed its affinity with Escalloniaceae, and the Angiosperm Phylogeny Website now includes it in that family.

Distribution and habitat
Eremosyne pectinata is largely confined to the Warren region of the Southwest Botanic Province of Western Australia.

References

External links
 
 
 
 
 

Asterids of Australia
Monotypic asterid genera
Eudicots of Western Australia
Taxa named by Stephan Endlicher
Escalloniaceae
Endemic flora of Southwest Australia